"Let Us Move On" is a song by English singer Dido. It features the vocals from American rapper Kendrick Lamar. The song was released in the United Kingdom on 17 December 2012 as a promotional single from her fourth studio album Girl Who Got Away (2013).

The song was written by Kendrick Lamar, Dido Armstrong, Rollo Armstrong, Jeff Bhasker and Pat Reynolds. This song was also featured on Aimee Lagos's film No Good Deed, starring Taraji P. Henson and Idris Elba.

Background
On Twitter, Dido talked about the meaning of the song saying "Just that life is long and bad times will pass x"

Music video

Lyric video
A lyric video to accompany the release of "Let Us Move On" was first released onto YouTube on 18 December 2012 at a total length of four minutes and twenty-one seconds.

Track listing

Credits and personnel
 Written by Dido Armstrong, Rollo Armstrong, Jeff Bhasker, Kendrick Lamar and Pat Reynolds
 Produced by Rollo and Dido
 Mixed by Ash Howes, Rollo and Dido
 Engineered by Pawel Sek
 Recorded at Enormous Studios, LA and Ark Studios
 Vocals by Dido and Kendrick Lamar
 Background vocals by Jeff Bhasker
 All instruments performed by Jeff Bhasker
 Additional organ and bass by Ash Howes
 Drum programming by Plain Pat and Rollo
 Mastered by Tom Coyne at Sterling Sound

Credits adapted from Girl Who Got Away album liner notes.

Chart performance
The song peaked at number 24 on the South Korea Gaon International Chart.

Weekly charts

Release history

References

2012 songs
Dido (singer) songs
Kendrick Lamar songs
Songs written by Dido (singer)
Songs written by Kendrick Lamar
Songs written by Rollo Armstrong
Songs written by Jeff Bhasker
Songs written by Plain Pat
Song recordings produced by Dido (singer)
Song recordings produced by Rollo Armstrong
Trip hop songs